Doliche can refer to several places in antiquity, including:

Cities
Doliche (Thessaly), a city of ancient Thessaly, Greece
Dolichi, a modern town located near to the site of the ancient city of Thessaly, Greece
Doliche, an ancient city of Asia Minor; modern Dülük near Gaziantep, Turkey

Islands
Doliche, also called Dolichiste, an island off the coast of Lycia, now called Kekova Adası, in Antalya Province, Turkey
Doliche, also called Dulichium, the chief island of the Echinades, off the coast of Acarnania, Greece
Doliche, also called Zenobii, was a classical name of the Khuriya Muriya Islands, in Oman
Doliche was an archaic synonym for the island of Crete, Greece